Overthinking refers to thinking about a situation or topic to an excessive amount or in a simpler way think about (something) too much or for too long. It affects a person mentally as well as emotionally.

Overthinking may also refer to: 

 Overthinking with Kat & June, 2018 web series
 Overthinking, 2018 EP by Shy Martin
 "Overthinking", song by Hands Like Houses from Anon
 "Over Thinker", song by Relient K from Two Lefts Don't Make a Right...but Three Do
 "Overthinker", song by INZO, Michael Anthony Inzano